Waiting to Inhale may refer to:

 Waiting to Inhale (Afroman album), 2008
 Waiting to Inhale (Dosia album), by Luni Coleone and others, 1998
 Waitin' to Inhale, a 2007 album by Devin the Dude
 Waiting to Inhale: Marijuana, Medicine and the Law, a 2006 film by Jed Riffe
 Waiting to Inhale: the Politics of Medical Marijuana, a 2000 book by Alan Bock
 "Waiting to Inhale", a 2002 episode of My Family (series 3)
 "Waiting to Inhale", a 1997 episode of Murphy Brown

See also
Waiting to Exhale, a 1995 American romance film